This article deals with Ravenloft. See also Dark Lord (disambiguation).

Darklord is a title used to refer to the mystically imprisoned and cursed ruler of a domain in Ravenloft, a campaign setting in the Dungeons & Dragons role-playing game.

Background
A Darklord was originally an individual who had committed a truly horrific crime, which drew the attention of the enigmatic Dark Powers. The Dark Powers then proceeded to craft a personal kingdom around the Darklord. This crafted domain serves both as a kingdom and a prison: the Darklord gains incredible powers while within its borders but can never leave it, although most Darklords can seal their domain borders with a thought. Within their domains, the Darklords are forever tormented by the objects of their desires, which are often the objects for which they committed their crimes. The Dark Powers dangle these objects before the Darklords like the fruits of Tantalus. Each Darklord's desires and motivations differ: some desire love, some hunger for glorious victory, while others crave for the defeat and humiliation of their enemies, which may include other rival Darklords.

The Advanced Dungeons & Dragons 2nd Edition supplement Darklords (1991) introduced sixteen new Darklords to the setting; "some of these Darklords would go on to have full adventures devoted to them, one would be the star of a SSI video game and still others would appear in published fiction. Yet others would never be seen again". Kevin Kulp, game designer, highlighted that "a notable aspect of this book is that most of the darklords aren't particularly powerful, even by 2nd edition AD&D standards. [...] It's also a nice reminder that just because someone is evil and despicable, they aren't necessarily particularly tough or good at combat. They may have other abilities, assets, or assistance". The 5th Edition sourcebook Van Richten's Guide to Ravenloft highlights that the "Darklords work in a different way than the standard D&D boss [...]. Their ability to lockdown their domain, spread a plague, or manipulate dreams isn't something you can quantify with numbers. Instead, a Darklord's powers are something to be deployed over the course of many sessions, making the players wonder when and if they'll ever get a chance to face their foe. [...] The Darklords of Ravenloft do battle by turning allies into enemies, depriving heroes of sleep with nightly haunts, and dangling hope just to yank it away at the last moment. [...] When players finally defeat a Darklord, it will be because they persevered and were resourceful in unraveling their enemy's many schemes".

Darklords
Known darklords have included:

Strahd von Zarovich, who was introduced in the original Ravenloft adventure
Azalin Rex, who was introduced in Ravenloft II: The House on Gryphon HillRavenloft: Realm of Terror (1990) introduced:
Gabrielle Aderre, lord of Invidia
Dominic d'Honaire, lord of Dementlieu
Ivan Dilisnya, lord of Dorvinia
Vlad Drakov/Vladeska Drakov, lord of Falkovnia
Lord Wilfred Godefroy, lord of Mordent
Hazlik, lord of Hazlan
Harkon Lukas, lord of Kartakass
Frantisek Markov. lord of Markovia
Mordenheim's Monster, "Adam", lord of Lamordia
Yagno Petrovna, lord of G'Henna
Jacqueline Renier, lord of Richemulot
Alfred Timothy, lord of Verbrek
Nathan Timothy, lord of Arkandale
Ivana Boritsi, lord of Borca
Duke Gundar, lord of Gundarak
Malken, lord of Nova Vaasa
Lord Soth, lord of Sithicus
Baron Urik von Kharkov, lord of Valachan
Jack Karn, lord of Farelle
Ankhtepot, lord of Har' Akir
Ladislav Mircea, lord of Sanguinia
Anton Misroi, lord of Souragne
Lord Arijani, lord of Sri Raji
Sir Torrance Bleysmith, lord of Staunton Bluff's
Easan the Mad, lord of Vechor
Sodo, lord of Zherisia

The supplement Darklords (1991) focuses on "sixteen different Darklords spread out over thirteen chapters". The Darklords detailed in this supplement are:

 Ankhtepot, a mummy
 Tristessa, a drow banshee
 Bluebeard
 Ebonbane, a living evil sword
 The Three Hags
 The Headless Horseman
 The House of Lament, an evil living house
 Von Kharkov, a panther who was polymorphed into a person and subsequently turned into a vampire
 Merilee, a child vampire
 Captain Alan Monette, a werebat pirate
 The Phantom Lover, an incubus
 Marquis Stezen d'Polarno, who drains the souls of victims
 Tiyet, a mummy who doesn't appear as undead
 Zolnik, a Loup de Noir werewolfRavenloft Monstrous Compendium Appendix II (1992) introduced:

Althea, lord of DemiseDomains of Dread (1997) added these:

Kas the Bloody-Handed
VecnaDragon'' #378 (August 2009) detailed:

Arantor, lord of Monadhan

References

Ravenloft characters